Sanriku earthquake may refer to:

 869 Sanriku earthquake
 1611 Sanriku earthquake
 1896 Sanriku earthquake
 1933 Sanriku earthquake
 1994 offshore Sanriku earthquake
 2012 Sanriku earthquake

See also
 Seismicity of the Sanriku coast
 Sanriku tsunami (disambiguation)